As They Made Us is a 2022 American drama film written, directed, and produced by Mayim Bialik in her feature directorial debut. The film stars Dianna Agron, Simon Helberg, Candice Bergen, Dustin Hoffman, Julian Gant, Charlie Weber, and Justin Chu Cary. The plot follows Abigail (Agron) and the last moments she and her family spend with her dying father (Hoffman). It was released in theaters and on VOD by Quiver Distribution on April 8, 2022. It received positive reviews from critics.

Synopsis
A series of flashbacks showcase Abigail's upbringing. In the present, Abigail is a divorced mother of two. A specialist recommends she hire a caregiver for her parents, Barbara and Eugene when the latter loses his ability to walk. Another doctor puts Eugene on hospice and says he has six months to live, devastating Barbara. Abigail visits her estranged brother, Nathan. Nathan talks to Eugene but refuses to visit Barbara. Abigail begins a relationship with Jay, a landscaper. Eugene confesses his love for Barbara before passing away a few days later. Abigail and Barbara attend his funeral but Nathan is emotionally unable to. Abigail argues with Nathan for leaving her alone during this emotional time. Six months later, Nathan invites Abigail to his daughter’s graduation party and they reconnect.

Cast
 Dianna Agron as Abigail, a harried and struggling divorcee and mother of two sons
 Simon Helberg as Nathan, Abigail's estranged brother
 Candice Bergen as Barbara, Abigail's difficult mother
 Dustin Hoffman as Eugene, Abigail's father whose health is failing
 Justin Chu Cary as Jay, a landscaper who Abigail is attracted to
 Charlie Weber as Peter, Abigail's unsupportive ex-husband
 Julian Gant as Garrick, Eugene's full-time in-home care nurse
 John Wollman as Dr. Ashkenazy, Eugene's original physician
 Sweta Keswani as Dr. Patel, a neurologist that Barbara goes to for a second opinion

Production
In September 2019, it was reported that actress Mayim Bialik would make her feature writing and directing debut with the drama film As Sick as They Made Us. In November 2019, it was announced that Dustin Hoffman, Candice Bergen, Simon Helberg and Olivia Thirlby would star. In a December 2020 interview, Bialik said it will be filmed after the COVID-19 pandemic.

In April 2021, it was reported that Dianna Agron had replaced Thirlby due to schedule disruption caused by the pandemic. In June 2021, Justin Chu Cary and Charlie Weber joined the cast as filming commenced in New Jersey.

Release
In February 2022, the film was acquired by Quiver Distribution, which released it in theaters and on video on demand on April 8, 2022.

Reception
On the review aggregator website Rotten Tomatoes, 81% of 21 critics' reviews are positive, with an average rating of 6.9/10. Metacritic, which uses a weighted average, assigned the film a score of 61 out of 100 based on 8 critics, indicating "generally favorable reviews".

References

External links
 

2020s English-language films
2022 drama films
2022 directorial debut films
2022 films
American drama films
Films impacted by the COVID-19 pandemic
Films shot in New Jersey
Quiver Distribution films
2020s American films